Lumaria afrotropica is a species of moth of the family Tortricidae. It is found in Cameroon.

The wingspan is about 9 mm. The ground colour of the forewings is creamy, suffused with pale ochreous at the base and near the termen. The forewing is strigulated (finely streaked) and dotted with brown, especially along the dorsum. There is a black-brown spot at the end of the median cell. The hindwings are pale brownish grey, but paler basally.

References

	

Endemic fauna of Cameroon
Moths described in 2002
Archipini